Malik Keith (born May 9, 1996), professionally known as Lege Kale (pronounced /lej/ /kale/), is an American record producer, songwriter and vocalist. In 2016 he gained critical acclaim as one of the producers of Kyle's single iSpy featuring Lil Yachty. His joint EP, "Tidal Graves" with frequent collaborator Khary released on July 28, 2017. In 2018, He worked with rising pop artist mastermind Still Woozy to create his new hit song "Habit", quickly amassing over 49 million streams on Spotify alone.

Early life
Malik Keith was born on May 9, 1996, in Columbus, Ohio. From an early age he took an interest in music after his grandmother would play jazz and blues records throughout his home. At the age of twelve he joined his middle school's percussion music program, leading on into most of his high school experience. This would eventually lead him on his path to become a producer. He later attended Ohio University as a student before choosing to pursue music production full-time as a career.

Career

2014-2015: Emergence On SoundCloud & Colours EP
Lege first gained prominence in January 2014, while in his second semester of college at Ohio University. Recording and producing songs out of his college dorm room, he started to slowly gain the attention of other up incomers on the platform SoundCloud such as Oshi, Madbliss, Masego, Brasstracks & Medasin after releasing unique remixes and flips of popular songs. He slowly gained the attention of industry level artists such as Roy Wood$, who would commission him to do an official remix for his song "All Of You". After continuing to rise, Lege released his first ever project "The Colours Ep", which gained him recognition from collectives such as Soulection, who would use his music to launch their first show on Beats 1 Radio.

2016-present: Singles Series & Tidal Graves EP
In 2016, Lege would go on to join the art label As We Arrive. Afterwards he would go on to produce American rapper Khary's first hit song "Find Me", which after reaching success as an initial release, saw an equally successful remix release featuring Sylvan Lacue via The Fader, and an addition to the official soundtrack for NBA Live 2018. Spanning the whole of 2016 starting in the summer, he released a series of original works which he collectively dubbed the "2016 Singles Series" which gained him support from fans & blogs such as Huffington Post. In September 2016, he released an official remix for Amine's Hit Song "Caroline" to popular acclaim. In December 2016, he accumulated a lot of attention from the music industry after co-producing Kyle's hit song iSpy, which arose to Number 4 on the billboard charts, and currently is certified at six times platinum by the RIAA

In 2017, he would go on to team up with American hip hop rapper Khary to release their joint Ep project "Tidal Graves" independently. Tidal Graves was released to major acclaim, and gained the attention of blogs such as XXL, Genius, Okayplayer, 2DopeBoyz, Mass Appeal & more. The project was produced entirely by Lege Kale, with Khary providing vocals for the majority of the project.

Influences
Growing up Lege was exposed to a lot of different sounds and genres, which ranged from the banging Hip Hop or smooth R&B that his mother would play on car rides to school; to Jazz, Blues & Soul that his Grandmother would play while cooking meals when he was a child. Later on he came to be influenced heavily by even more diverse genres, delving in sounds from Bossa Nova Legends such as Stan Getz & Sergio Mendez, to Rock and even sometimes country artists. During his college years he would go on to discover more electronic artists and was introduced to what would become known as future beats, a newly emerging genre combining key elements of all of these things.

Discography

Extended plays
 The Colours EP (2015)
 Tidal Graves EP (2017)

Official remixes
 Roy Woods - All Of You (Lege Kale Remix) (2015)
 Khary - Ambidextrous (Lege Kale Remix) (2015)
 Yeek - The Drums (Lege Kale Remix) (2016)
 Amine - Caroline (Lege Kale Remix) (2016)
 Smino - Ballet (Lege Kale Flip) (2016)

Production discography

2016
Khary - Intern Aquarium
 16. Find Me
 Find Me (Remix) Feat. Sylvan Lacue

2017
Singles
 Kyle - iSpy featuring Lil Yachty
Khary & Lege Kale - Tidal Graves Ep
 1. Tidal Graves
 2. Stronger
 3. Too Fast
 4. Fujiko
 5. Control Pt. 1
 6. Control Pt. 2
 7. Desperado
Caleborate - Real Person Lp
 Soul
 Fine

2018
Singles
 Still Woozy - Habit

2019
Singles
 Caleborate - Away From

References

1996 births
American hip hop musicians
American hip hop DJs
Living people
Rappers from Columbus, Ohio
21st-century American rappers